Urban Search and Rescue New Mexico Task Force  or NM-TF1 was a FEMA Urban Search and Rescue Task Force based in the State of New Mexico sponsored by the State.

FEMA revoked accreditation for NM-TF1 on 16 September 2015 due to a persistent inability to maintain a fully operational urban search and rescue team.

References

New Mexico 1
Government of New Mexico